Asrangue Souleymane (born 1982 in Bangui) is a former college basketball power forward with the University of New Orleans Privateers. Souleymane began his career with the Cincinnati Bearcats. He is from the Central African Republic and played with his national team at the FIBA Africa Championship 2005 and 2007.

References

External links
 Profile at ESPN.com
 Profile at Yahoo.com

1982 births
Living people
Central African Republic men's basketball players
New Orleans Privateers men's basketball players
Cincinnati Bearcats men's basketball players
People from Bangui